Marquise Marianna Panciatichi Ximenes d’Aragona Paulucci (3 February 1835 – 7 December 1919) was an Italian malacologist who also made contributions to botany and ornithology. A specialist in non-marine molluscs, she published 32 malacological works, describing two genera and 159 species, and is commemorated in around 40 scientific names of organisms: primarily molluscs, as well as the fossil shark Scyllium pauluccii and the bird subspecies Sylvia atricapilla pauluccii.

Life and work 
In 1853 she married Marquis Alessandro Anafesto Paulucci, a botanist and son of Filippo Paulucci. In 1866 she published the first scientific work on the fossil gastropod Murex veranyi.

In 1887, after her husband's death, and ten years after her father died, the Marquise had to abandon her studies as well as her collections so she could devote her energies almost entirely to the administration of her significant family affairs. To do so, she donated her collections of non-marine molluscs (dating back to 1862, when she was just 27 years old) to the Natural History Museum at the University of Florence and her bird collection of about 1,200 specimens ones to the Municipality of San Gimignano, Italy.

Her herb collection of 4,153 specimens belonging to 1,492 different species was donated to the Galileo Galilei Technical Institute. She died on 7 December 1919 in her villa near Regello.

Selected publications 

 Paulucci, M. (1878). Matériaux pour servir à l'étude de la faune malacologique terrestre et fluviatile de l'Italie et de ses îles.
 Paulucci, M. (1879). Escursione scientifica nella Calabria 1877-78: fauna malacologica; specie terrestri e fluviatili. F. lli Bocca.
 Paulucci, M. (1879). Fauna malacologia: specie terrestri e fluviatili enumerate e descritte da M. Paulucci. Con tavole illustrative. Coi tipi dell'Arte della stampa.
 Paulucci, M. P. (1881). Descrizione di una nuova specie del genere'Acme'''.
 Paulucci, M. (1882). Note malacologiche sulla fauna terrestre e fluviale dell'isola di Sardegna. Tip. dell'ancora de G. Bargellini.
 Paulucci, M. (1886). GLI ALBERI LUNGO LE PUBBLICHE STRADE. Bullettino della R. Società Toscana di Orticultura, 1''(3), 69-71.

See also
Timeline of women in science

References

External links

Italian malacologists
Italian naturalists
19th-century Italian zoologists
Conchologists
1835 births
1919 deaths
19th-century Italian women scientists
Women naturalists
Women zoologists
Scientists from Florence